Silk Cut (also Elanders/Ten Celsius, JMS Next Generation) is a Volvo Ocean 60 yacht. She finished fifth in the 1997–98 Whitbread Round the World Race skippered by Lawrie Smith.

Career
Silk Cut was designed by Bruce Farr and built by McConaghy Boats.

She finished fifth in the 1997–98 Whitbread Round the World Race skippered by Lawrie Smith.

Elanders/Ten Celsius competed in the 2003 Volvo Baltic Race helmed by Hans Wallén.

JMS Next Generation competed in the 2004 Volvo Baltic Race.

Boudragon is currently owned by the Oceanraces Academy.

References

Volvo Ocean Race yachts
Sailing yachts of the United Kingdom
Sailing yachts of Sweden
Sailing yachts of Norway
Volvo Ocean 60 yachts
1990s sailing yachts
Sailboat types built by McConaghy Boats